Aylmerton is a Northern Village of the Southern Highlands of New South Wales, Australia in Wingecarribee Shire. It is located north-east of Mittagong.  The only buildings in Aylmerton are a fire station and houses, many of which are on farms.

There is also an Aylmerton in Norfolk, England.

Transport 
Aylmerton is positioned between the Hume Highway on its northwestern side and the Main South railway line on its southeastern side. They are the main road and rail routes between Sydney and Melbourne.

Industry 
Near the demolished train station is a small industrial zone which is part of Braemar. It contains a few industrial complexes and a Bunnings Hardware Store.

Population
According to the 2021 census, the population of Aylmerton was 195.

References

Towns of the Southern Highlands (New South Wales)
Hume Highway
Main Southern railway line, New South Wales